Cathbarr O'Donnell (died 1608) was an Irish nobleman (a member of the O'Donnell dynasty of Donegal).

Biography
Cathbarr was the son of Sir Hugh O'Donnell, the ruler of Tyrconnell during the Elizabethan era. His mother was Sir Hugh's Scottish second wife Iníon Dubh.

Cathbarr's elder brothers Donnell and Hugh Roe were rivals in the lengthy Ó Domhnaill succession dispute until Donnell's death at the Battle of Doire Leathan in 1590. Hugh Roe became head of the Ó Domhnaills in 1592. Cathbarr supported his elder brother during Tyrone's Rebellion (1594–1603). In 1602 another elder brother Rory succeeded Hugh Roe and made peace with the Crown. The following year Rory was made Earl of Tyrconnell.

Cathbarr married Rosa O'Doherty, the sister of the Inishowen lord Sir Cahir O'Doherty who fought on the Crown's side during Tyrone's rebellion but later launched O'Doherty's Rebellion by burning Derry. In 1607 Cathbarr and Rosa accompanied Rory in the Flight of the Earls to Continental Europe. The following year Cathbarr and Rory both died of fever in Italian exile and the leadership of the O'Donnell's passed to Rory's young son.

After Cathbarr's death, Rosa remarried to the Irish soldier Owen Roe O'Neill. Cathbarr's son with Rosa, Hugh O'Donnell became a Captain in the Spanish Army, serving in his stepfather's regiment in Flanders. He was killed in 1625 during the Siege of Breda.

Family tree

Notes

References

Further reading
 McCavitt, John (2002). The Flight of the Earls. Gill & MacMillan.

Irish emigrants to Italy
16th-century Irish people
Flight of the Earls
17th-century Irish people
People from County Donegal
Year of birth unknown
1608 deaths
Cathbarr